Chasing Yesterday is the second studio album by English rock band Noel Gallagher's High Flying Birds. Written and produced by frontman Noel Gallagher, the album was recorded from 2012 to 2014 at Strangeways and Abbey Road Studios in London. It was released on 2 March 2015 by Gallagher's record label Sour Mash Records, preceded by the singles "In the Heat of the Moment" and "Ballad of the Mighty I". Chasing Yesterday topped the UK Albums Chart in its first week of release.

Background
Noel Gallagher first confirmed that he was working on a follow-up to 2011's Noel Gallagher's High Flying Birds in August 2013 during an interview on sports radio station Talksport, stating: "I've got tons of songs left over from the last one. I'm writing, putting stuff together. Yeah, I'll definitely make another [album], that's for sure". In October he revealed that he was ready to start recording the album, explaining that he was "just waiting now for availabilities of my band and producers" to begin.

In February 2014, former Oasis producer Mark Coyle revealed that Gallagher had written between 50 and 60 songs for the new album, which he was in the process of "whittling down into an album". Talking about the songs, he claimed that "Noel's new album is fucking great", comparing it in style to Oasis album Definitely Maybe (1994), and describing it as "seismic".

Gallagher officially announced Chasing Yesterday on 13 October 2014 at a question-and-answer event hosted by Facebook in London, revealing the album's title, release date, track listing, supporting UK tour, and first two singles.

Recording and production
Gallagher's regular producer Dave Sardy was unavailable to work on Chasing Yesterday, so the album was self-produced by the High Flying Birds frontman, who stated that he "enjoyed the freedom of [producing the album] but not the responsibility".

Lead single "In the Heat of the Moment" was the final song recorded for the album. Chasing Yesterday was completed by July 2014, but due to touring commitments and the reissues of Oasis albums it was held for release for several months, with Gallagher proclaiming that the wait was "beginning to do [his] head in".

Former Smiths guitarist Johnny Marr performed on the album's second single, "Ballad of the Mighty I". Speaking about the collaboration during the initial announcement of the album, Gallagher stated that "He's a very enthusiastic artist and I tried to get him to play on 'What a Life' ... He's a truly great guitarist and he has something that nobody else has. He's amazing, a top man." Gallagher has claimed that Marr arrived to record his part for the track without having heard a demo, and that his contribution helped make the song "one of the best" he'd ever written.

Promotion and release
The first music video from the album, for lead single "In the Heat of the Moment", was released on 23 October 2014. The song was released as the first single from the album on 17 November, and entered the UK Singles Chart at number 26. A music video was also released for the single's B-side, "Do the Damage", the following month. "Ballad of the Mighty I" was released as the second single and third music video from the album, including "Revolution Song", as its B-side the following year. The third single to be released was "Riverman" in May 2015, containing the new song "Leave My Guitar Alone". The fourth single to be released is "Lock All The Doors" and was available on 7" vinyl from 28 August 2015 and was backed with brand new song "Here's a Candle (for Your Birthday Cake)". Finally, the fifth single to be released from the album was “The Dying Of The Light", only available in certain regions on 7" vinyl from 11 December 2015 and contained a demo version of the song; "The Girl With X-Ray Eyes", previously featured on the album itself.

The first concert tour in promotion of Chasing Yesterday was detailed during the initial announcement of the album in October 2014, with six shows confirmed in the UK and Ireland between 3 and 10 March 2015, all of which sold out in minutes. The shows saw Gallagher and the band accompanied by a choir and a horn section, and featured setlists including songs from former band Oasis, and both High Flying Birds albums. A North American tour was also scheduled for May and June 2015.

Title
The title of Chasing Yesterday was revealed during the album's official announcement on 13 October 2014. Speaking during the announcement, Gallagher claimed that he "literally came up with it [a week earlier]", adding that "if [he] could change it [he] would change it".

The title "Chasing Yesterday" appears in the lyrics to the track "While the Song Remains the Same."

Composition
Speaking about Chasing Yesterday in January 2015, Gallagher revealed that opening track "Riverman" is his favourite track on the album, and one of his favourite tracks he's written. He also spoke about "The Right Stuff", comparing the style of the song to that of Queens of the Stone Age, The Rolling Stones and T. Rex.

Gallagher told NME that "On the original running order 'The Mexican' wasn't on the album, but I felt it needed something there to lighten the mood a bit".

Critical reception

Chasing Yesterday received positive reviews from music critics. On Metacritic, which assigns a normalised rating out of 100 to reviews from mainstream critics, the album received an average score of 68 based on 26 reviews, indicating "generally favorable reviews".

Rolling Stone gave a positive review stating, "The greater appeal of Chasing Yesterday is in the way Gallagher, 47, now does reflection, loss and persistent optimism, leavening his usual power chords and pub-choir-ready choruses with a dusky, psychedelic churn that exposes the long, hidden thread running from early-Seventies Traffic to The Stone Roses." Mojo gave the album a 4/5 rating writing that, "While it may appear to arrive under a typically vague or clanging banner in the tradition of Dig Out Your Soul or Standing on the Shoulder of Giants, Chasing Yesterday is the most fittingly titled album to bear Noel Gallagher's name. The 47-year-old is in reflective lyrical mode, revealing his view from middle age, trying to find peace with the past, or (textbook mid-life crisis material) searching for a spectral, unattainable female."

NME awarded the album a score of 7/10 and commended Gallagher for blending his typical style with new influences "what do we expect from Noel Gallagher? Too much, probably, like all the other '90s Britrock titans who've never been adequately replaced. 'Chasing Yesterday' has its flaws, but they're far outnumbered by moments where it succeeds in catching up with its titular quarry. The past will never be a foreign country to Noel Gallagher, but from this vantage point, tomorrow is looking pretty rosy." Helen Brown, writing for The Telegraph gave Chasing Yesterday a score of 3/5 concluding "The USP of this record is its warmer, looser atmosphere. Songs begin with little studio scuffles, exhalations and murmurs. Then, in the middle there's an unexpectedly trippy little chill out number called The Right Stuff with a bassline that oozes with the retro-gloop of a lava lamp. Nice for Gallagher to stop chasing after yesterday for a while and just enjoy remembering it."

Chasing Yesterday won 'Best Album' at the 2015 Q Awards.

Track listing

Personnel

Noel Gallagher's High Flying Birds
Noel Gallagher – vocals, electric guitars, acoustic guitars, bass, mellotron, piano, keyboards, percussion, electric washboard, production, artwork concept
Paul Stacey – electric guitars, bass, mellotron, keyboards, recording
Jeremy Stacey – drums
Mike Rowe – keyboards
Production personnel
Amorphous Androgynous – production (tracks 6 and 8)
Matt Howe – strings recording
Craig Silvey – mixing
Greg Calbi – mastering

Additional musicians
Jim Hunt – saxophone and bass clarinet (tracks 1 and 6)
Beccy Byrne – backing vocals (tracks 1, 3, 5 and 7)
Vula Malinga – backing vocals (tracks 2 and 8)
Joy Rose – backing vocals (track 6)
Garry Cobain – backing vocals (track 8)
Johnny Marr – electric guitar (track 10)
Rosie Danvers – string arrangements 
The Wired Strings – strings (track 10)
Artwork personnel
Matthew Cooper – layout design
Lawrence Watson – photography
Jen Stacey – photography

Charts

Weekly charts

Year-end charts

Certifications

Release history

References

External links

Chasing Yesterday at YouTube (streamed copy where licensed)
 

2015 albums
Noel Gallagher's High Flying Birds albums